The men's Greco-Roman featherweight competition at the 1932 Summer Olympics in Los Angeles took place from 5 August to 7 August at the Grand Olympic Auditorium. Nations were limited to one competitor. This weight class was limited to wrestlers weighing up to 87kg.

This Greco-Roman wrestling competition followed the same format that was introduced at the 1928 Summer Olympics, using an elimination system based on the accumulation of points. Each round featured all wrestlers pairing off and wrestling one bout (with one wrestler having a bye if there were an odd number). The loser received 3 points. The winner received 1 point if the win was by decision and 0 points if the win was by fall. At the end of each round, any wrestler with at least 5 points was eliminated.

Schedule

Results

Round 1

With only three wrestlers, Gruppioni had a bye and only one bout was contested in the first round. Svensson won by decision.

 Bouts

 Points

Round 2

Svensson had the bye this round, staying at 1 point. Gruppioni lost to Pellinen by fall, resulting in both having a total of 3 points.

 Bouts

 Points

Final round

Svensson won his second bout, giving Gruppioni his second loss. Svensson took the gold, having beat Pellinen previously.

 Bouts

 Points

References

Wrestling at the 1932 Summer Olympics